Chop Gate is a small village in the Hambleton district of North Yorkshire, England. The village lies within the North York Moors National Park.

References

Villages in North Yorkshire